Altum is the second studio album recorded by the Finnish Gothic metal band Silentium. The EP album SI.VM E.T A.V.VM was released as Altum's "little sister album", being this one released before Altum. The album was released in 2001 by the Finnish label Spikefarm.

Track listing

 Revangelis (6:02)
 Blasphemer (5:50)
 To My Beloved (5:30)
 Painless (5:25)
 ...Repent... (4:27)
 Into the Arms of the Night... (5:30)
 The Lusticon (6:54)
 The Sinful (6:14)
 The Propheter of the Unenthroned (6:56)

Personnel

 Matti Aikio - vocals, Bass
 Sami Boman - Keyboard, backing vocals
 Jani Laaksonen - Violin
 Toni Lahtinen - Guitar
 Juha Lehtioksa - Guitar
 Tiina Lehvonen - vocals
 Janne Ojala - drums

2001 albums
Silentium albums